Baclaran is a barangay in Parañaque, Philippines. In Parañaque, it may refer to:

Baclaran LRT Station, a station on the Manila LRT Yellow Line, Parañaque
Baclaran Church, also called the National Shrine of Our Mother of Perpetual Help
Baclaran Mosque, a demolished mosque that once stood in Parañaque

Baclaran may also refer to:

Baclaran, Cabuyao, a barangay in Laguna, Philippines